Organomegaly is the abnormal enlargement of organs. For example, cardiomegaly is enlargement of the heart. Visceromegaly is the enlargement of abdominal organs. Examples of visceromegaly are enlarged liver (hepatomegaly), spleen (splenomegaly), stomach, kidneys, and pancreas.

Definitions for various organs
Values refer to adults unless otherwise specified.

References

Medical signs
Symptoms and signs: Digestive system and abdomen